Sir Edward Thornton, FRS (22 October 1766 – 3 July 1852) was a British diplomat, and father of Sir Edward Thornton (1817–1906).

He was born in London, the third son (of three sons and two daughters; a brother was the merchant Thomas Thornton) of William Thornton (1738–1769), who had come from Hull, East Yorkshire to London and established himself as a prosperous innkeeper and Freeman of the City of London, and Dorothy (née Thompson; died 1769), described by Sir Edward Thornton as "a countrywoman... a native of the... East Riding, of a very respectable family". Dorothy died three months after the birth of a daughter, and eight months later, William was suddenly taken ill and died soon after, leaving their children orphaned.

Being left in the care of a family friend, using his guardian's connections Thornton was educated at Christ's Hospital and at Pembroke College, Cambridge. In 1902 Christ's Hospital named one of its boarding houses after him.

He became British vice-consul in Maryland in June 1793 and was ambassador to the United States from 1800 to 1804. He was then posted to Sweden as minister-plenipotentiary in December 1807 with the objective of forming an alliance against Napoleon, returning to England in November 1808. In October 1811 he went again to Sweden (until 1817) on a special mission in HMS Victory and he successfully negotiated treaties of alliance with both Sweden and Russia, both called the Treaty of Örebro. This was the first stage in the creation of an alliance of Northern European States against Napoleon. He negotiated the Treaty of Kiel for the United Kingdom and was present with the prince royal of Sweden (Jean Baptiste Bernadotte) when the allies entered Paris in 1815.

He became a member of the Privy council in 1816. He was appointed minister to Portugal in July 1817 and joined the Portuguese court in Brazil. He was ambassador to Portugal from April 1819 to March 1821, when he returned to England. He returned again to Portugal as an ambassador from August 1823 to August 1824 during which time he invested the King of Portugal with the Order of the Garter and assisted the King during the insurrection. The title of Count of Cacilhas in the Portuguese nobility was conferred on Thornton and his heirs for three generations by the King of Portugal.

He was elected a Fellow of the Royal Society in June 1810, appointed GCB in 1822 and retired in August 1824. He had married in 1812 Wilhelmina Kohp of Hanover with whom he had one daughter and six sons. In retirement he lived in Wembury House, Plymouth, Devon, where he died in 1852.

References

1766 births
1852 deaths
Ambassadors of the United Kingdom to the United States
People educated at Christ's Hospital
Members of the Privy Council of the United Kingdom
Knights Grand Cross of the Order of the Bath
Fellows of the Royal Society
Ambassadors of the United Kingdom to Sweden
Ambassadors of the United Kingdom to Portugal
Ambassadors of the United Kingdom to Russia
Ambassadors of the United Kingdom to Denmark